Nitrosomonas eutropha is an ammonia-oxidizing, Gram-negative bacterium from the genus of Nitrosomonas.

Starting in 2014, it was being tested by the biotech company AOBiome for its possible health benefits on skin. AOBiome started a Phase II trial of an intranasal formulation of the bacteria for migraines.

References

External links
Type strain of Nitrosomonas eutropha at BacDive -  the Bacterial Diversity Metadatabase	

Gram-negative bacteria
Nitrosomonadaceae
Bacteria described in 2001